Benedicto is both a given name and a surname. Notable people with the name include:

 Benedicto Caldarella (born 1939), Argentine motorcycle road racer
 Benedicto Godoy Véizaga, Bolivian footballer who played in the 1950 World Cup
 Benedicto Kiwanuka (1922–1972), first Prime Minister of Uganda
 Benedicto de Moraes Menezes (1906-?), Brazilian footballer
 Benedicto "Magnum" Membrere (born 1982), Filipino basketball player
 Benedicto Villablanca (born 1957), Chilean former professional boxer
 Joaquín Dicenta Benedicto (1862–1917), Spanish journalist, novelist, playwright and poet
 José E. Benedicto, Treasurer of Puerto Rico
 Lourdes Benedicto (born 1974), American actress

See also
 Leo de Benedicto Christiano (11th century), convert to Christianity
 Benedict (disambiguation)
 Benedicta
 Benedictum
 Benedictus (disambiguation)
 Salvador Benedicto
 San Benedicto